Oliver Batista Meier (born 16 February 2001) is a German professional footballer who plays as a winger for  club SC Verl, on loan from Dynamo Dresden.

Club career
Batista Meier made his professional debut for Bayern Munich II in the 3. Liga on 20 July 2019, starting in an away 3–1 loss to Würzburger Kickers. On 30 May 2020, he made his first appearance for the first team, which was also his debut in the Bundesliga, when he replaced Serge Gnabry in the 78th minute of a 5–0 win over Fortuna Düsseldorf, at the Allianz Arena.

On 10 September 2020, Batista Meier joined Eredivisie side Heerenveen on a season-long loan deal with option to buy.

On 11 January 2023, Batista Meier moved to SC Verl on a 1.5-year loan.

International career
Batista Meier came through the Germany national team youth setups and played at the 2018 UEFA European Under-17 Championship. He received a call up to the Brazil U20s in November 2019, but remains uncapped for his second nation.

Personal life
Batista Meier was born in Kaiserslautern, Rhineland-Palatinate to a German father and Brazilian mother. He grew up speaking both German and Brazilian Portuguese, though he admits that he has since forgotten most of his Portuguese.

Career statistics

Club

Honours
Bayern Munich
 Bundesliga: 2019–20
 DFB-Pokal: 2019–20
 UEFA Champions League: 2019–20

Individual
Fritz Walter Medal U17 Silver: 2018

References

External links
 
 
 

2001 births
Living people
People from Kaiserslautern
Footballers from Rhineland-Palatinate
Brazilian footballers
Brazil youth international footballers
German footballers
Germany youth international footballers
Brazilian people of German descent
German people of Brazilian descent
Association football wingers
FC Bayern Munich II players
FC Bayern Munich footballers
SC Heerenveen players
Dynamo Dresden players
SC Verl players
Bundesliga players
3. Liga players
Regionalliga players
Eredivisie players
Brazilian expatriate footballers
Brazilian expatriate sportspeople in the Netherlands
German expatriate footballers
German expatriate sportspeople in the Netherlands
Expatriate footballers in the Netherlands